Krinkino is a rural locality (a village) in Biryakovskoye Rural Settlement, Sokolsky District, Vologda Oblast, Russia. The population was 18 as of 2002.

Geography 
Krinkino is located 100 km northeast of Sokol (the district's administrative centre) by road. Biryakovo is the nearest rural locality.

References 

Rural localities in Sokolsky District, Vologda Oblast